Raoti or Rawati is a town and tehsil of Ratlam district in the Indian state of Madhya Pradesh. It was once a part of the Sailana State
It falls in the Malwa region of Madhya Pradesh.

History
Raoti was founded in the year 1635–1636, when the new Maharaja Ratan singh came to the throne of Ratlam State. It passed on to a descendant called Pratap Singh. Raja Pratap singh killed his elder brother Raja Keshri Singh of Ratlam and conquered Ratlam and Dhamnod. Pratap Singh was then killed by Keshri Singhs younger son Jai Singh at the battle of Sagode. Who then became Raoti's ruler in 1716. Raoti was the capital of Sailana State until Raja Jai Singh decided to build a new capital. He constructed Sailana as his new capital in 1736. Raja Jai Singh then gave Raoti to a Rathore of the Prithvirajot branch. This family ruled for many generations, one of the thakuranis also built a temple outside the garhi at the cost of Rs.5,000. The Prithvirajot line of Raoti went extinct due to no successors. After which Raja Jaswant Singh of Sailana gave Raoti to one of his younger sons. Raoti was a 1st class thikana of Sailana State. A small fortified palace still exists in Raoti.

Geography 

Demographics
Raoti's total population as per the provisional population data for census 2011 is reported to be 4,948. Males constitute approximately 51% of the population and females 49%

Transport

Railways
Not many trains stop at Raoti stations except for few long distance and local trains.

Roads

Raoti is now well connected to nearby towns and villages, due to the Pradhan Mantri Gram Sadak Yojana and NREGA.

Educational institutions

Schools 
 Government primary school 
 Government middle school
 Government higher secondary school
 Government Girl's primary school
 Government Girl's middle school
 Government Girl's higher secondary school
 Shri Jain public school
 Shri Sant Jamnadas public school
 Government Degree College Mela Ground Raoti Ratlam

References

Cities and towns in Ratlam district